FAT TOM is a mnemonic device used in the food service industry to describe the six favorable conditions required for the growth of foodborne pathogens. It is an acronym for food, acidity, time, temperature, oxygen and moisture.

Conditions 
Each of the six conditions that foster the growth foodborne pathogens are defined in set ranges:

See also
 
 HACCP
 Sanitation Standard Operating Procedures

References

Food safety